A quintuple combination pumper or quint is a fire-fighting apparatus that serves the dual purpose of an engine and a ladder truck.  “Quintuple” refers to the five functions that a quint provides - pump, water tank, fire hose, aerial device, and ground ladders. Also, Tillers, Tractor Drawn Aerials, also have quint features. These were dubbed,"Quillers."

References
https://docs.google.com/spreadsheets/d/14DxY_wUN7hAlDwpGZLsPwC_IZP-x-eXFOzaIccvtwBM/edit?usp=sharing spreadsheet listing fire departments in USA with multiple quints

Fire service vehicles

da:Drejestige#Quint